Dhenkanal Palace is the official palace of the Bhoi dynasty of Dhenkanal princely state, India. Built by the Bhois of Dhenkanal, this palace is located in Dhenkanal town, Odisha.

This palace was turned into a homestay in 1992.

Location 
Dhenkanal Palace is located on the slopes of the Paniohala Hill in Dhenkanal.

See also
Dhenkanal State

References 

Royal residences in India
Dhenkanal district
Palaces in Odisha
Buildings and structures in Odisha
Tourist attractions in Odisha